Guilherme Conceição Cardoso or simply Guilherme (born July 11, 1983, in Uberlândia), is a Brazilian defensive midfielder. He currently plays for Anapolina.

Honours
Bahia State League: 2007

Contract
Vitória (Loan) 1 January 2007 to 31 December 2007
Cruzeiro 1 January 2007 to 31 December 2008

External links
 CBF
 ecvitoria.com

1983 births
Living people
Brazilian footballers
Association football midfielders
Campeonato Brasileiro Série A players
Campeonato Brasileiro Série B players
Campeonato Brasileiro Série C players
Cruzeiro Esporte Clube players
Esporte Clube Bahia players
Esporte Clube Vitória players
Paysandu Sport Club players
Vila Nova Futebol Clube players
Uberlândia Esporte Clube players
Associação Atlética Anapolina players